St Luke's Church is in Manor Lane, Slyne-with-Hest, Lancaster, Lancashire, England. It is an active Anglican parish church in the deanery of Tunstall, the archdeaconry of Lancaster, and the diocese of Blackburn. Its benefice is united with those of St Saviour, Aughton, and St Wilfrid, Halton. The church is recorded in the National Heritage List for England as a designated Grade II listed building.

History

The church was built between 1898 and 1900 to a design by the Lancaster architects Austin and Paley. It cost £2,358 (equivalent to £ in ), and provided seating for 180 people. The church was originally a chapel of ease in the parish of Holy Trinity, Bolton-le-Sands, becoming a parish church in its own right in 1934.

Architecture

St Luke's is constructed in sandstone rubble, with red tiled roofs and a timber porch. Its plan consists of a nave, a north aisle, a north porch, a chancel, and a tower at the crossing. The tower has a hipped roof, a buttress at the southwest, and a stair turret rising to a greater height than the tower at the south east. A wooden bellcote protrudes from the roof of the tower.

Inside the church is a three-bay arcade carried on circular piers. The tower has a flat ceiling, while the roofs of the nave and chancel are open. The font dates from 1905, is in white marble, and is in the form of an angel carrying a scallop shell.

See also

Listed buildings in Slyne-with-Hest
List of ecclesiastical works by Austin and Paley (1895–1914)

References

Church of England church buildings in Lancashire
Grade II listed churches in Lancashire
Gothic Revival church buildings in England
Gothic Revival architecture in Lancashire
Churches completed in 1900
Diocese of Blackburn
Austin and Paley buildings
Churches in the City of Lancaster